The ITF Seafarers' Trust is a charitable maritime trust located in London, United Kingdom. It was established in 1981 by the Executive Board of the International Transport Workers' Federation (ITF), a global federation of transport workers' unions with over 4.6 million worker members. The stated mission of the Trust is to assist with "the moral, spiritual and physical welfare of seafarers regardless of nationality, race or creed." The Trust receives funds from both the Trust's own capital funds and by the investment income of the ITF Seafarers' International Assistance, Welfare and Protection Fund, more commonly known as the "Welfare Fund". That fund, despite its name, is used to provide a wide range of trade union services to seafarers. The Trust is limited to supporting projects which directly benefit individual seafarers' spiritual, moral or physical welfare.

History

The ITF Seafarers' Trust was established by the ITF Executive Board in 1981 as a body with charitable status under UK law.  The Trust financially supports organisations that directly provide welfare services to seafarers, acting as a catalyst for positive change in the maritime community, support long-term programmes that improve maritime workers’ health and welfare through direct and normative change. Its funding comes from the investment income of the ITF Seafarers' International Welfare Assistance and Protection Fund and from capital funds held by the Trust itself.

Since its launch in 1981, the Trust has provided some US$200m to support seafarers' welfare around the world.  ITF former general secretary David Cockroft had observed that the Trust had originally been seen as something of a ‘minibus jackpot’ for organisations seeking grants to provide shore-based transport for seafarers visiting ports - but it was now a sophisticated and effective organisation that coordinated global work to meet the complex welfare needs of seafarers.

Finances 
One of the Trust’s main areas of funding is providing seafarers’ centres/ships visitors with the means of transporting themselves and seafarers to and from ships by granting service providers funds to purchase appropriate vehicles. The Trust has provided over  £2.5 million for this purpose over the last 34 years.

Total grants awarded in 2015 totaled £1,988,062.00. The majority of grants were awarded to projects relating to operational support for maritime charities as well as vehicle purchase and replacement programmes.

During 2021, the Trust’s income was £1,263,859 (including almost £1m in donations), while their expenditure was £5,629,898, including 1.1% spent on fundraising . 

In 2015, the Trust unveiled a new logo as well as developing a new website alongside upgrades to the Shore Leave app.

Governance 
The Seafarers' Trust is governed by a Board of Trustees, that are responsible for setting the Trust’s strategy, ensuring it fulfils its objectives, and that good governance is carried out. The Head of Trust is responsible for the daily operation of the Trust and is assisted by a full-time secretariat who undertake various administrative, project and programme management activities.

Trustees 

The Trust Deed makes provision for a minimum of five Trustees and a maximum of nine. At present there are six Trustees: 
 Dave Heindel, Chair of the ITF Seafarers’ Trust, Chair of the ITF Seafarers’ Section and Secretary-Treasurer of Seafarers’ International Union (SIU).
 Stephen Cotton, ITF General Secretary.
 Paddy Crumlin, ITF President, Chair of the ITF Dockers’ Section and National Secretary of Maritime Union of Australia (MUA).
 Jacqueline Smith, Maritime Coordinator of the ITF, former President of the Norwegian Seafarers' Union (NSU).
 Brian Orrell OBE, former General Secretary of Nautilus UK and former Chairperson of the ITF Seafarers’ Section and the Trust.
 Maya Schwiegershausen-Guth, Co-Head of Aviation & Maritime Section and Secretary at Vereinte Dienstleistungsgewerkschaft

Head of the ITF Seafarers' Trust 

Katie Higginbottom, serves as the Head of the ITF Seafarers' Trust.

Activities

Maritime Piracy Humanitarian Response Programme (MPHRP) 

MPHRP is a programme to help seafarers and families cope with the physical and mental trauma caused by torture and abuse at the hands of pirates launches today in London, England, funded by the ITF Seafarers' Trust and run by The International Seafarers' Welfare and Assistance Network.

Funded by the ITF Seafarers' Trust charity and the TK Foundation, the programme speaks for an alliance of shipowners, trade unions, managers, manning agents, insurers and welfare associations representing the entire shipping industry, from crews to owners.

Its mission is to aid seafarers who have been or may be subject to pirate attack. Somali-based pirates now regularly treat hostage seafarers with extreme violence in order to put pressure on their families and/or employers to expedite their ransom demands. This includes phoning family members and making the seafarer plead for his life while he is abused and threatened with death, and filming this and posting it online for relatives to see.

Seafarers' Emergency Fund (SEF) 
The Seafarers Emergency Fund (SEF) has been set up by both The TK Foundation and the ITF Seafarers' Trust, administered by ISWAN. The Fund provides immediate, essential aid to seafarers and families of seafarers, who are directly involved in sudden and unforeseen crises. This Fund is available to seafarer welfare organizations and other welfare organizations to provide the means to purchase goods and/or services for seafarers and/or the spouse or children of seafarers to relieve the need(s) brought on in relation with a sudden and unforeseen crisis. The minimum grant available is $250.00 USD whilst the maximum grant available is $5,000 USD.

Shore Leave 3.0 

Shore Leave is a free, offline app that allows seafarers to store in their smartphones contact details of all the seafarers’ centres around the world available for download on Android and iPhone. The idea behind the original app was to transform the ISWAN seafarers’ centres directory into an interactive app that could be used offline. In just a few clicks, seafarers can call the nearest mission for assistance or the SeafarerHelp line for more serious issues or they can simply use the app to find information about the Seafarers’ Trust and the International Committee on Seafarers’ Welfare (ICSW), the organisation providing the database of seafarers’ centres. In 2017, Shore Leave 3.0 was unveiled by the Trust which includes additional features like the possibility for seafarers to leave reviews of seafarers’ centres. Seamen’s clubs are all about seafarers, so we want to hear your advice on how to improve the service offered. With this feature seafarers can rate seamen’s clubs and leave feedbacks on the quality of their experience ashore in more than 400 clubs around the world. This will help to better address their requests and improve the quality of the welfare on offer.

Seafarers' Rights International (SRI) 
The ITF Seafarers’ Trust are the sole funders of Seafarers’ Rights International (SRI).

SRI is an independent centre dedicated to advancing the rights of seafarers through research, education and training in issues concerning seafarers and the law.  SRI's aims to promote, implement, enforce and advance all seafarers’ and fishers’ rights and remedies, including human rights and the rights of other persons on board vessels.

Fellowships at the World Maritime University 
The Trust supports up to five students per year to study at the World Maritime University in Sweden. Over the years the Trust has sponsored over 100 students to study a range of post-graduate courses, mainly in the areas of Law and the Humanities.

Seafarers' Help 
Hosted by the International Seafarers’ Welfare and Assistance Network (ISWAN) and supported by the Seafarers’ Trust, SeafarerHelp is a 24/7, 365 days per year assistance service available to seafarers of all kinds, all around the world. Available in a wide range of languages and available by telephone, email, SMS, live-chat and letter, SeafarerHelp is a help and advice service with problems relating to life aboard the ship or concerns about health.

Other Works
The Trust partners with ICMA and NAMMA for several programmes around the world, including providing data SIM cards and Christmas care packages during Covid-19 and publishing a book, Out of Sight, Not Out of Mind: 40 Portraits of Seafarers by Seafarers. ICMA and NAMMA are both Christian associations which represent the great majority of seafarers’ centres around the world.

References

External links
 Official website
 ISWAN website
 Namma website
  T K Foundation website
 Seafarers' Trust piracy guide
 Guides for shipping companies to support seafarers and families affected by piracy; Seafarers’ Trust announces latest donations at The Seafarer Times / Seamen News Portal (for Filipino sailors)

Charities based in London